Nuestra Belleza Querétaro 2011, was held at the Centro de Congresos Querétaro in Querétaro, Querétaro on July 14, 2011. At the conclusion of the final night of competition Adriana Martínez of Querétaro City was crowned the winner. Martínez was crowned by outgoing Nuestra Belleza Querétaro titleholder María Perusquía. Nine contestants competed for the title.

Results

Placements

Background Music
Ragazzi

Contestants

References

External links
Official Website

Nuestra Belleza México